Peter Stevens may refer to:

Peter Stevens (car designer) (born 1945), British car designer
Peter Stevens (Manitoba politician)
Peter Stevens (RAF officer) (1919–1979), German-Jewish RAF bomber pilot and prison of war escapee
Peter F. Stevens (born 1944), English botanist
Peter P. Stevens (1909–1989), head college football coach for the Temple University Owls
Peter John Stevens (born 1995), Slovenian swimmer
Peter Fayssoux Stevens (1830–1910), American soldier, educator and clergyman

See also
Peter Stephens (disambiguation)
Peter Stevenson, former Irish Gaelic footballer